Murphy Prototypes is an Irish auto racing team founded by ex-single seater racer Greg Murphy. The team is based in Dublin and currently, compete in the European Le Mans Series driving an Oreca 03-Nissan in the LMP2 class as well as competing at the 24 Hours of Le Mans.

History
The team was founded in January 2012 by former Asian Formula Three Championship  driver Greg Murphy. They entered into that years European Le Mans Series in the LMP2 class with an Oreca 03-Nissan. During the opening round of the season at Paul Ricard, they bowed out early after just 64 laps but finished third at the following round in Donington. The team were also accepted to compete at Le Mans along with 19 other LMP2 entrants. They fielded a strong line up which included Mercedes AMG Formula One test driver at the time Brendon Hartley who now competes in Toyota LMP1 programme. The team were highly competitive throughout the race and led for a number of times in the LMP2 class before a gearbox failure in the middle of the night put an end to their maiden Le Mans voyage.

2013 is arguably Murphy Prototypes best season to date. They finished fourth in the 2013 European Le Mans Series season which saw the team pick up their first victory in the ELMS at the final round in Paul Ricard. They also finished well at Le Mans as the Oreca-Nissan of Murphy Prototypes finished 12th overall and sixth in the LMP2 class. The team signed former Formula One driver Karun Chandhok for the race.

Murphy's 2014 campaign saw them finish seventh in the 2014 ELMS standings having earned just one podium in the opening round at Silverstone. Their Le Mans 2014 campaign lasted just 73 laps after a collision during a spell of torrential rain with fellow LMP2 competitors Greaves Motorsport put an abrupt end to their race.

For 2015, Murphy Prototypes have been successfully entered into the European Le Mans Series and the Le Mans 24 Hours for the fourth consecutive year although they have yet to sign any drivers for the season.

Other ventures
In addition to their racing team division, Murphy Prototypes also has an 'Alternative Powered Vehicles' division which specialise in designing cars based around alternative power sources such as electricity. Team principal Greg Murphy is well established in the alternative fuels market having already founded Biodiesel Ireland in 2004 and Greenwell Resources in 2010.

24 Hours of Le Mans results

References

External links

Auto racing teams established in 2012
2012 establishments in Ireland
24 Hours of Le Mans teams
European Le Mans Series teams
Irish auto racing teams